Camilo Ignacio Saldaña Inostroza (born 13 July 1999) is a Chilean footballer who plays for Rangers.

References

1999 births
Living people
Chilean footballers
Chilean Primera División players
Club Deportivo Palestino footballers
Association football midfielders